Jurassic Park: Original Motion Picture Soundtrack is the film score to the 1993 Steven Spielberg film of the same name, composed and conducted by John Williams. Alexander Courage and John Neufeld served as orchestrators.

MCA Records released a soundtrack album for the film on May 25, 1993. Also produced by Williams, this album includes most of the film's major cues, sometimes edited together into longer tracks and often containing material that was unused in the film. Several passages are also repeated in different tracks. A 20th anniversary edition of the soundtrack was released by Geffen Records on April 9, 2013, featuring additional unreleased music. A John Williams collection edition, joint with the soundtrack to The Lost World, was released by La-La Land Records on November 29, 2016, remastered and featuring more additional unreleased music. The score received critical acclaim and is often considered to be one of the most iconic and beloved scores of Williams' career.

Composition
Williams began writing the Jurassic Park score at the end of February 1993, and it was conducted a month later; because Williams sustained a back injury during the scoring sessions, several cues were conducted by Artie Kane (Kane is uncredited in the film, but receives special thanks in the 1993 soundtrack album's credits and is listed as a conductor in the La-La Land Records set). John Neufeld and Alexander Courage orchestrated the score. The composition process was done in Skywalker Ranch concurrently with the sound editing process, leading Williams to get inspiration from Gary Rydstrom's work with dinosaur noises. Williams described it as, "a rugged, noisy effort—a massive job of symphonic cartooning". He also said that, while trying to, "match the rhythmic gyrations of the dinosaurs", he ended up creating, "these kind of funny ballets". As with another Spielberg film he scored, Close Encounters of the Third Kind, Williams felt he needed to write, "pieces that would convey a sense of 'awe' and fascination", given that the movie dealt with the, "overwhelming happiness and excitement", that would emerge from seeing live dinosaurs. In turn, more suspenseful scenes, such as the Tyrannosaurus rex attack, earned frightening themes. For the first time, Spielberg was unable to attend the recording sessions for one of his own movies, as he was in Poland filming Schindler's List. Instead, Williams gave Spielberg demo tapes with piano versions of the main themes prior to his travel, and the director would listen to them daily on the way to the sets.

The score uses a large orchestra that often includes a variety of percussion, two harps, baritone horns, and choir. Some passages also call for unusual woodwinds, such as shakuhachi and E♭ piccolo oboe. Furthermore, Williams included synthesizers in much of the score. Some cues, such as "Dennis Steals the Embryos", feature them prominently, but many of the synth passages are mixed much more quietly, often doubling the woodwinds or helping flesh out the lower harmonies. Several prominent celeste solos (such as in "Remembering Petticoat Lane") are also performed on synthesizers.

Themes
Two major melodic ideas can be heard in this score.

The first motif, which is heard most frequently, is known simply as "Theme from Jurassic Park", and is introduced when the visitors first see the Brachiosaurus. It features, "gentle religioso cantilena lines", which Williams declared was an attempt, "to capture the awesome beauty and sublimity of the dinosaurs in nature". This theme is widely regarded as one of John Williams' greatest. There are a couple different variants of "Theme from Jurassic Park". One is an extended version, heard in "Welcome to Jurassic Park". The second is a shorter, more tender version heard in various parts of the film. It revolves around a softer version of the theme's climax. This softer version was slightly modified and used for the track "A Tree for My Bed".

Another theme, "Journey to the Island", takes the form of a noble fanfare. It is first heard as the helicopter approaches Isla Nublar. The composer described it as an, "adventure theme, high-spirited and brassy, thrilling and upbeat musically". The original version of "Journey to the Island" also consists of "Theme from Jurassic Park". Variations of "Theme from Jurassic Park" and "Journey to the Island" are used for the score's quieter, more tender moments, typically with woodwinds, horns, or keyboards. Williams stated that these leitmotifs were reused in order to make the pieces become an overarching theme for the park itself, "which could be used in several different places, and when orchestrated differently, could convey the beauty of what they were seeing at first".

A third theme was also composed and is very different from the main two. Comprising four menacing notes, it is heard frequently in scenes involving the threat of the carnivorous dinosaurs—the raptors in particular. The cue "Into the Kitchen" (entitled "The Raptor Attack" on the original soundtrack) explores this motif extensively. The motif drew inspiration from Williams' previous suspense music, such as the shark motif from Jaws, and utilized "wild orchestral and choral things; the idea was to shake the floor and scare everybody". This theme also features the ending of "Journey to the Island" as its finale. Williams described it as, "operatic in a dramatic way", and an opportunity for him to emphasize the, "swashbuckling aspects of the orchestra".

Track listing

Note: The track "End Credits" is an excerpt from "Welcome to Jurassic Park", the film's actual end credits music.

20th Anniversary Edition
For the 20th anniversary of the film's release, the score was re-released digitally by Geffen Records on April 9, 2013. This re-release included four bonus tracks personally selected by John Williams.

John Williams Collection Edition
The score, along with that of The Lost World, was remastered and re-released by La-La Land Records on November 29, 2016. This 4-CD re-release included expanded tracks of John Williams' original motion picture score to the film along with the four bonus tracks from the 20th Anniversary Edition.

Expanded Edition
La-La Land Records also re-released the album on July 5th of 2022, which included both the tracks from the John Williams Collection Edition and most of the songs from the 20th anniversary edition.

Charts

See also

 John Williams
 The Lost World: Jurassic Park (film score)
 Jurassic Park III (film score)
 Jurassic World (film score)

References

Jurassic Park film scores
John Williams soundtracks
Adventure film soundtracks
1993 soundtrack albums
1990s film soundtrack albums
MCA Records soundtracks
La-La Land Records soundtracks
Geffen Records soundtracks